Shuangta Subdistrict is a township-level division of Gusu District, Suzhou, Jiangsu, China.

History 
On March 24, 2017, Fengmen Subdistrict was merged into Shuangta Subdistrict.

Administrative divisions 
As of 2020, Shuangta Subdistrict administers the following 21 residential communities:

 Baibu Street Community
 Changdao Community
 Canglangting Community
 Chengwan Community
 Cuiyuan Community
 Dagongyuan Community
 Dinghuisixiang Community
 Erlangxiang Community
 Fengxi Community
 Gunxiufang Community
 Hongfeng Community
 Heng Street Community
 Jinfan Road Community
 Lihe Community
 Lianqing Community
 Midu Community
 Tangjiaxiang Community
 Wangshixiang Community
 Xingxiu Community
 Yangzhi Community
 Zhonglou Community

See also
Fengmen Subdistrict
List of township-level divisions of Suzhou

References

Township-level divisions of Suzhou
Gusu District